Mickey MacGowan (19 June 1900 – 29 December 1977) was a Canadian boxer. He competed in the men's featherweight event at the 1924 Summer Olympics.

References

External links
 

1900 births
1977 deaths
Canadian male boxers
Olympic boxers of Canada
Boxers at the 1924 Summer Olympics
Boxers from Montreal
Anglophone Quebec people
Featherweight boxers